Jaco Burger (born 16 August 1968) is a South African cricketer. He played in fifteen first-class and eleven List A matches from 1989/90 and 1995/96.

See also
 List of Boland representative cricketers

References

External links
 

1968 births
Living people
South African cricketers
Boland cricketers
Eastern Province cricketers
Griqualand West cricketers
Cricketers from Cape Town